"Broken" is a song by British singer-songwriter Jake Bugg. It was released as the seventh and final single from his self-titled debut album (2012). It was released as a digital download in the United Kingdom on 21 June 2013. The song peaked at number 44 on the UK Singles Chart.

Background
There are two versions of the song: the original which featured on Jake Bugg's debut album, and a re-recording which is not on the album but was released as an official single in 2013. The former was written by Jake Bugg and Crispin Hunt, with Hunt also handling production duties. In early 2013, Jake Bugg worked with renowned producer Rick Rubin on a new version of "Broken" to be released as the final single from his debut album. The new version, recorded at Rubin's Shangri La Studios in Malibu, California, featured drumming by Chad Smith of the Red Hot Chili Peppers.
The song was written about his Glaswegian love interest Abigail Carter.
The recording sessions at Shangri La Studios inspired the title of Jake Bugg's second album, where much of it was also recorded with Rick Rubin.

Music video
A music video to accompany the release of "Broken" was first released onto YouTube on 20 June 2013 at a total length of five minutes and thirteen seconds.

Track listings

Chart performance

Certifications

Release history

References

2012 songs
2013 singles
Jake Bugg songs
Songs written by Jake Bugg
Songs written by Crispin Hunt
Mercury Records singles